Warreella is a genus of flowering plants from the orchid family, Orchidaceae. It has two known species, both native to northwestern South America.

Warreella cyanea (Lindl.) Schltr. - Colombia + Venezuela
Warreella patula Garay - Colombia

See also 
 List of Orchidaceae genera

References

External links 

Zygopetalinae genera
Zygopetalinae
Orchids of South America